United States v. Louisiana or Louisiana v. United States refers to a number of cases heard by the United States Supreme Court:

Louisiana v. United States (1881), 103 U.S. 289 (1881) 
United States v. Louisiana (1887), 123 U.S. 32 (1887) 
United States v. Louisiana (1888), 127 U.S. 182 (1888) 
United States v. Louisiana (1933),  
United States v. Louisiana (1950),  
United States v. Louisiana (1957),  
United States v. Louisiana (1960),  
United States v. Louisiana (1960) (second case),  
Legislature of Louisiana v. United States,  (per curiam) 
Louisiana v. United States (1965), on voting rights
United States v. Louisiana (1965), on state's rights to offshore resources
Louisiana v. United States (1967),  (per curiam) 
United States v. Louisiana (1967),  
United States v. Louisiana (1969),  
United States v. Louisiana (1969) (second case), 
United States v. Louisiana (1971),  
United States v. Louisiana (1972),  
United States v. Louisiana (1975),  (per curiam) 
United States v. Louisiana (1975) (second case),  
United States v. Louisiana (1980),  
United States v. Louisiana (1981),  
United States v. Louisiana (1982),  
United States v. Louisiana (1985),  
United States v. Louisiana (1988),  
United States v. Louisiana (1990),  
United States v. Louisiana (1993),  
United States v. Louisiana (1998), 

Legal history of Louisiana